Sarv (also known as Sūr, Saur, Savar, and Sowr) is a village in Darmian Rural District, in the Central District of Darmian County, South Khorasan Province, Iran. At the 2006 census, its population was 615, in 148 families.

References 

Populated places in Darmian County